The 2023 Major League Baseball draft will take place in July 2023 in Seattle. The draft will assign amateur baseball players to MLB teams. For the first time, a draft lottery will be used to set a portion of the draft order. The first six selections will be set via the lottery, with picks belonging to the remaining lottery participants to be set in reverse order of regular season winning percentage. To complete the first round, playoff teams will then select in an order that combines postseason finish, revenue sharing status, and reverse order of winning percentage. Reverse order of regular season winning percentage will be used to set the draft order for rounds 2 through 20. In addition, compensation picks will be distributed for players who did not sign from the 2022 MLB Draft.

The Pittsburgh Pirates won the inaugural MLB Draft Lottery, and will have the first selection in the draft. It is expected that the first round picks of the New York Mets and Los Angeles Dodgers will move down 10 slots as a result of those teams exceeding the first luxury tax threshold by $40 million or more.

Draft lottery
The draft lottery for the 2023 MLB Draft took place on December 6, 2022 in San Diego.

The following table lists the percentage chances for each team to get specific picks as a result of the draft lottery.

Top prospects
Source: MLB.com Prospect Rankings 2023

Draft selections

First round

Competitive Balance Round A

Second round

Competitive Balance Round B

Compensatory round

Notes
Compensation picks

References

Major League Baseball draft
Draft
Major League Baseball draft
Major League Baseball draft
Major League Baseball draft
Baseball in Seattle
Events in Seattle
Major League Baseball draft